Kostylev (from костыль meaning crutch) is a Russian masculine surname, its feminine counterpart is Kostyleva. It may refer to
Aleksei Kostylev (1914–1989), Russian football player
Gennadi Kostylev (born 1940), Russian football coach and a former player
Leonid Kostylev (born 1989), Russian boxer
Nikolay Kostylev (1938–1993), Russian weightlifter
Nikolay Kostylev (born 1995), musician and producer. Member of Russian group IC3PEAK

Russian-language surnames